NRN is a television station originating in Coffs Harbour, Australia owned by WIN Corporation as part of the WIN Television network, affiliated to Network 10. The station was formally a partnership between NRN-11 Coffs Harbour (launched 23 January 1965) and RTN-8 Lismore (launched 12 May 1962).

History

Origins
NRN11 Coffs Harbour had merged with ECN8 Taree to form Northern Rivers Television, but later demerged in 1969. Around 1971, RTN8 Lismore and NRN11 merged, also forming Northern Rivers Television (NRTV), but was known on-air originally as 11-8 Television. The merged stations served the Mid North Coast and Northern Rivers areas of Northern New South Wales. During the mid-1970s, the station was concurrently known as Great Eastland Television, when the partnership shared programming and advertising with NEN-9 Tamworth and DDQ-10 Toowoomba/SDQ-4 Warwick, but they soon reverted to the NRTV brand.

In 1983, NRTV was relayed into the Gold Coast after a lobbying campaign from residents, although they could also watch the commercial television stations from Brisbane. NRTV's Gold Coast studios and offices were constructed in Ashmore on Southport Nerang Road. The Gold Coast facilities didn't contain a newsroom, although relayed local news from the Coffs Harbour studios. News crews from Lismore travelled to the Gold Coast for stories of importance.

NRTV produced a considerable amount of local activity (approximately five each week). Local content included local news, three hours of live women's variety "Round About", 5 half-hours of live children's variety "Get Set", "Birthdays", and "Razzamataz, with on-air presenter Rhonda Logan" weekly, holiday specials "Summerthon", and a half-hour daily exercise program "Jazzacize". Live sports specials included the annual Grafton Cup Racing Carnival and the Grafton to Inverell Cycling Classic.

Live programs mainly originated from the Coffs Harbour Studios with programs being recorded at both the networks other studios located at Lismore and Gold Coast.

Some of the memorable names from that era were:
 Ron Lawrence - Ron died in 2008. He was the driving force behind the network's local production. He began his career as booth announcer at the Lismore Radio and TV Studios of Northern Star Holdings (RTN 8) and (Radio 2LM) after graduating from Jim Illife's AIR-TV College in Brisbane. He moved to Coffs Harbour TV studios in the early 70s after the merge between NRN11 and RTN 8 and became the station announcer–news reader. Later in his career he became Program Manager then later Station Manager and finally General Manager before retiring in the 90s
 Wayne Magee, also a diploma graduate from the Brisbane College AIR-TV (formally with Radio 4GY Gympie, BCV TV Victoria and National Nine News Adelaide) started with the network in 1976. During his time with the network he hosted Get Set, network specials and telethons and read local TV news. He eventually moved into management before leaving the network to become a minister.
 Chris Wordsworth who hailed from Townsville QLD and who had worked previously in radio. Chris hosted the children's show for a period and read main bulletin news Monday to Friday. He later joined Channel Seven Sydney as late edition news reader – journalist, was briefly a Chief of Staff for a QLD Politician and later assumed the role of Director of ABC QLD/NT.
 Greg Hughes who succeeded Wordsworth as News Reader and station announcer. He formally had worked for the Mike Walsh owned Penrith radio station. In the early 1990s Greg moved to Canberra to join the 2CC Breakfast Club, a team that later moved to sister station Mix 106.3. Greg also presented the weather on Ten Capital in Canberra for several years from the mid-1990s to 2001. He left broadcasting to work for the Army PR Dept.
 Rhonda Logan was the on-air presenter of 'Birthdays' and children's television show 'Razzamataz' and presented 'Weather' during the nightly news for three years. Rhonda simultaneously worked in commercial and community radio:(2CS)(2CHY-FM) and was a weekly columnist for newspapers,'Harbour Views', 'Coffs Harbour Advocate'.

1990s to 2000s
1990 saw plans for NRTV to be merged with southern Queensland's Vision TV to form a larger regional network to respond to the growing aggregation of television into regional areas of the nation, but they were called off. On 31 December 1991, Northern New South Wales became the third area to be aggregated, and NRTV, via links to Network 10 (it was part of Northern Star Holdings), owned by Westfield Group chairman Frank Lowy), became its affiliate in the region. At one stage, NRTV was the subject of a bid from WIN Television. Nothing came of it, but had WIN gone through with the bid, it would have made NRTV the Nine Network affiliate (using the logos of its parent station in southern NSW and the campaigns of the Nine Network, attempting a replication of the affiliation steal during the 1990 aggregation of Regional Queensland television) and would have left NBN as Network 10's affiliate instead in the area.

NRTV was later sold to Telecasters Australia, who also owned the Queensland affiliate of Network 10. In 1994, the station was renamed Ten Northern NSW, and its station identification was changed to that of Network 10. The station stopped producing regional news for Coffs Harbour, Lismore and Gold Coast. They had previously produced a licence-wide bulletin, but that was axed due to poor ratings.

NRN launched 10 Bold on 2 July 2009.

2010s
NRN launched 10 Peach on 11 January 2011, replacing a simulcast of the main channel.

On 1 July 2016, Southern Cross Ten's unique branding began to phase out on NRN in favour of Ten's mainstream branding as Ten. This comes after Southern Cross switched all of its SC10 stations (except NRN) as Southern Cross Nine as part of its new program supply agreement with the Nine Network. Southern Cross announced on 13 September 2016 that 10 HD would be launched on channel 52 on 21 September 2016. In addition, 10 Bold was reduced to a standard definition broadcast to accommodate 10 HD.

In late January 2017, it was announced that Southern Cross had entered into negotiations with WIN Corporation, owners of regional Ten-affiliate WIN Television, over the sale of NRN in exchange for WIN's Wollongong radio station i98FM. This deal would have expanded WIN's television coverage across all regional markets in the eastern states and granted Southern Cross radio coverage in Wollongong. Southern Cross later withdrew from negotiations on 20 February 2017 with no explanation given. However, WIN and Southern Cross later finalised an agreement where they would sell NRN to WIN for a total of $55 million, with the sale taking effect on 31 May 2017. NRN was maintained as Ten Northern NSW until playout and transmission were transferred to WIN's MediaHub facility in Ingleburn on 1 September 2017, when the station adopted the WIN branding. Channel numbers were also reshuffled for NRN to align with WIN's other stations, but as Nine-owned NBN Television holds the 8-numbered digital channels in northern NSW, NRN's digital channels remain on the 5-numbered digital channels.

2020s
On 23 June 2021, following the announcement that WIN Television would be reinstating Nine Network content starting on 1 July 2021, NRN via WIN Television have extended their affiliation agreement with Network 10 for the regional Northern NSW market for the next five years due to Nine operating NBN. As a result, NRN became a direct relay of TEN-10 Sydney and TVQ10 Brisbane with no local news or network preempts for local content, but with local advertisements inserted to serve regional viewers. On 1 July 2021, the WIN branding was retired after 5 years and replaced with generic 10 metro branding. There are currently no plans for 10 Shake to be launched in Northern NSW and Gold Coast.

News
From 2004 until 31 August 2017, Southern Cross produced short local news updates which are broadcast throughout the day. These bulletins were branded as Southern Cross Ten News, Southern Cross News, Ten Local News Updates from 1 July 2016. The updates were produced from Southern Cross' Canberra studios and made use of news content from local radio stations owned by Southern Cross Austereo in each market. Local sport and weather reports also aired on an sporadic basis. Short updates also aired throughout the day and evening alongside updates from Ten Eyewitness News. The bulletins were researched, produced and presented by a single journalist.

Though the purchase of NRN by WIN was finalised on 31 May 2017, playout and transmission remained under Southern Cross' control until transferred to WIN on 1 September 2017. During this interim period, Southern Cross continued to produce local news updates for NRN. From September 2017, WIN News took over the production of 90 second local updates for NRN. Upon acquiring NRN, WIN has not launched or produced a local news bulletin for the region, citing changes to media landscape, decline in traditional television viewership, and due to their affiliation with Network 10. They also aired WIN's All Australian News though, despite the fact that no local stories from Northern NSW and Gold Coast aired on this bulletin. The local news updates are currently presented by Ariana Gatti.

As a Network 10 affiliate, NRN also transmits Studio 10, The Project and 10 News First.

Main transmitters

 1. HAAT estimated from http://www.itu.int/SRTM3/ using EHAAT.
 2. The Richmond and Tweed station was an independent station with the callsign RTN from its 1962 sign-on until aggregation in 1991.
 3. Analogue services ceased transmission as of 27 November 2012 as part of national conversion to digital-only television
 4. NRN was originally licensed to broadcast on VHF 10 but in August 1965 received approval to change to 11 following reports that the Channel 10 signal was prone to interference

References

See also
 Regional television in Australia
 WIN Television

Television stations in New South Wales
Television channels and stations established in 1965
WIN Television